Balkh University is a public university located in Mazar-i-Sharif, capital of Balkh Province in northern Afghanistan. Established in 1986, the university has about 18,000 students and is the third-largest in Afghanistan after Kabul University and Nangarhar University. Faculties include medicine, engineering, economics, journalism, literature, law and science.

Printing and publishing scientific journal entitled “Balkh Scientific Journal” and “Marafat” which in both of them publish the works and research of lecturers. Balkh University has monthly outlook (News paper, of cultural and analysis of Balkh University) and Balkh Journalistic monthly newspaper (Department of Journalism outlook.

The students have access to the university's library. Furthermore, the university has dedicated facilities for sports, physical education and sporting events.

As part of its contributions to the rebuilding of Afghanistan, the government of Pakistan expanded the university by adding the Liaquat Ali Khan Faculty of Engineering, a 10 million dollar separate block, completed in 2012.

See also 
List of universities in Afghanistan

References

External links
Balkh University English

Universities in Afghanistan
Educational institutions established in 1987
Mazar-i-Sharif
1987 establishments in Afghanistan
Public universities in Afghanistan